Biharu is an administrative ward in Buhigwe District  of Kigoma Region of Tanzania. In 2016 the Tanzania National Bureau of Statistics report there were 9,774 people in the ward, from 8,880 in 2012.

Villages / neighborhoods 
The ward has 2 villages and 6 hamlets.
 Biharu 
 Kagunga
 Kaguruka
 Musenga
 Kigege 
 Kigege
 Kulugongoni
 Lulemba

References

Buhigwe District
Wards of Kigoma Region